Robert Joseph Kral (born 5 July 1967) is an Australian film and television composer. He is best known for composing music scores for horror, superhero, and many animated WB productions. He scored the TV series, Angel (the spin-off of Buffy the Vampire Slayer), for most of the entire series (1999–2004, Seasons 1 through 5). In February 2005, a soundtrack album, Angel: Live Fast, Die Never, was released, with 18 out of 25 tracks composed by Kral. He also composed the scores for the TV series Miracles (2003) for ABC / Touchstone, Jake 2.0 (2003–04), Duck Dodgers (2003–05) for Warner Bros. Animation, The Inside (2005) for Fox Television, and the Lionsgate / Sci Fi series, The Lost Room (2006). His animated film scores include Superman: Doomsday (2007), Green Lantern: First Flight (2009), Scooby-Doo! Legend of the Phantosaur (2011) and Superman vs. The Elite (2012). He scored the animated TV series, Scooby-Doo! Mystery Incorporated (2010–13) and DVD feature film "Batman: Assault on Arkham" (2014). Recent soundtrack productions include the scores for "Justice League Dark" (2017), "Suicide Squad: Hell To Pay" (2018) and Scooby-Doo! Return to Zombie Island (2019). In 2005, Kral won an Annie Award for Best Music in an Animated Television Production, for his work on Duck Dodgers.

Biography
Robert Joseph Kral was born on 5 July 1967 in Medindie, South Australia. From four-years-old he started to learn the drums and then piano, the following year. At the age of 15 years he started writing music for full orchestra, with the symphonic work "The Revival of Zion". He studied music at the Elder Conservatorium of the University of Adelaide completing a Bachelor of Music. He was taught by Tristram Cary, United Kingdom-born film composer, for part of his degree. Kral later recalled "I was mostly interested in creating moods and atmospheres for stories ... I’ve always been captivated by how movies can move an audience emotionally, due in great part to a good score". After university he worked for the South Australian Film Corporation and Channel Nine sound departments. In 1988 he began composing for many medical documentaries, beginning with composing and performing the soundtrack for Thalassaemia, a Relative Chance, an instructional video, on "the genetics and spread of Thalassaemia" for Adelaide Children's Hospital.

During his studies, he met American composer Lolita Ritmanis, who encouraged him to seek work in Los Angeles. In the early 1990s he provided the music for a 30-minute videocassette, Victoria: Australia's Garden State, which was used to promote that state's tourist attractions, and a total of 24 videos for Panorama Australia covering other cities and regions of Australia In 1991–92 Kral studied film scoring at the University of Southern California, he composed several small film scores, and feature film Maslin Beach (1997), which was filmed at the South Australian location of the same name.

Kral applied for work with Mike Post, a US TV music composer, but was picked up by Post's associate, Christophe Beck. Beck had scored Buffy the Vampire Slayer from its second season in 1998, and used Kral as a ghost-writer. Beck asked Kral to work with him on the new spin-off series Angel, which commenced airing in October 1999. In Buffy, Ballads, and Bad Guys Who Sing: Music in the Worlds of Joss Whedon (November 2010) Kral is described by Matthew Mills as belonging to the "Christophe Beck 'school'" with fellow composers of the Buffy/Angel shows. Beck and Kral worked closely during season 1, sometimes co-composing, while Kral continued independently for seasons 2 to 5 as Beck concentrated on Buffy and other projects. Angel finished its last season in May 2004.

In 2000 Kral released a sound collection for use in TV production, Robert J. Kral Collection, on Transition Music, which compiled 21 of his tracks. In February 2005, a soundtrack album, Angel: Live Fast, Die Never, was released on Virgin Records, with 18 out of 25 tracks composed by Kral. In 2005, Kral won an Annie Award for Best Music in an Animated Television Production, for his work on the cartoon series, Duck Dodgers (2003–05). In 2007 he scored the music for The Dresden Files (Lionsgate / Sci Fi Channel), the animated DVD feature film Superman: Doomsday for Warner Bros., and co-composed Batman: Gotham Knight (2005) animated DVD feature also for Warner Bros. He described the Superman: Doomsday soundtrack as "So big and epic and emotional. I like material that moves you through a series of emotions".

Kral's work in 2008 included scoring The Haunting in Connecticut, for Gold Circle Films / Lionsgate, which was released in theatres in March 2009 to a domestic US opening weekend of $25 million, and Green Lantern: First Flight (2009) for Warner Bros. Animation (DVD feature film). His 2009 scores included the Scooby Doo animated feature for WB animation: Scooby-Doo! Abracadabra-Doo (aired in 2010). Kral scored the related animated TV series, Scooby-Doo! Mystery Incorporated (2010–13) and WB animated DVD feature, Scooby-Doo! Camp Scare in 2010, with DVD productions of Scooby-Doo! Legend of the Phantosaur (2011) and Superman vs. The Elite (2012), "Scooby Doo! Stage Fright!" (2013) and "Batman: Assault on Arkham" (2014). Additional soundtrack CD releases include Superman: Doomsday (2007), Batman: Gotham Knight (2008) and "Batman: Assault on Arkham" (2014). In 2012 he scored a TV movie, Fatal Honeymoon, which dramatised the death of Tina Watson.

From September 1997 Kral lived in Pasadena, then Rolling Hills Estates as of 2003, he is married to Alison Houghton Kral, a theological writer, and the couple have a daughter and son. In 2012 he told Kevin Zimmerman of SESAC Magazine that when composing it is "important that in the end you sound like yourself, or it's all just the same. I'm glad I had piano lessons, because now so much of the work comes from inputting music into sequencing programs via MIDI keyboard. The technology in the last 10 years has exploded, and taking advantage of that is really the job of every composer today".

Discography

Soundtrack albums
 Robert J. Kral Collection – Transition Music (2000)
 Angel: Live Fast, Die Never – Rounder Records (14 February 2005 (UK) / 17 May 2005 (US))
 Superman: Doomsday – La-La Land Records (23 October 2007)
 The Haunting in Connecticut – Bulletproof, Verve (31 March 2009)
 Green Lantern: First Flight – La-La Land Records (6 October 2009)
 Batman: Assault on Arkham – La-La Land Records (11 August 2014)
 Justice League Dark – La-La Land Records (February 2017)

Filmography

Film

Television

References

External links

– Review of Batman: Assault on Arkham score soundtrack
 "It's all in front of him – award-winning composer Robert Kral, of Semaphore Park writes another score", photo ca. 1990, held at State Library of South Australia in the Messenger Press Collection.
"A Visit with Robert Kral: Angel Music Composer" archived from the original on 26 January 2001, interviewed by CityofAngel.com.
Superman Doomsday soundtrack music review
Bluntinstrument.org
Behind the Scenes, featuring Robert J. Kral, City of Angel.
– Review of Superman Doomsday soundtrack CD

1967 births
Annie Award winners
Australian film score composers
Australian television composers
La-La Land Records artists
Living people
Male film score composers
Male television composers
Musicians from Adelaide
USC Thornton School of Music alumni
University of Adelaide alumni